Antonella Carta  (born 1 March 1967 in Nuoro) is an Italian footballer who played as a midfielder for the Italy women's national football team. She was part of the team at the UEFA Women's Euro 1997 and 1999 FIFA Women's World Cup where she was the team captain.

References

External links
 

1967 births
Living people
Italian women's footballers
Italy women's international footballers
People from Nuoro
1999 FIFA Women's World Cup players
Women's association football midfielders
FIFA Century Club
Footballers from Sardinia
ACF Milan 82 players
ACF Milan players
Torres Calcio Femminile players
Torino Women A.S.D. players
Roma Calcio Femminile players
A.C.F. Trani 80 players
Sardinian women